China National Highway 209 (G209) runs from Sonid Left Banner, Inner Mongolia to Beihai, Guangxi province. It is
3,435 kilometres in length and runs south from Huhhot towards Shanxi province, Henan province, Hubei province, Hunan province, and ends in Guangxi province.

Despite the "National Highway" designation, G209 is not of uniform quality throughout its length.   For example, as of 2009, the 20-kilometer section north of Badong is nothing but a very poor dirt road. Nonetheless, even that section is of importance for the national highway system: it is used e.g. by long-distance buses plying the route between Badong and points east. Many parts of the Muyu to Hongping section (in Hubei's Shennongjia Forestry District) are not much better. On the other hand, the section from the Shennongjia National Park entry to Muyu to  Baishahe Village (in Nanyang Town, Xingshan County) is part of a recently upgraded Yichang-Shennongjia Highway.

Route and distance

Image gallery

See also
 China National Highways

References

External links
Official website of Ministry of Transport of PRC

209
Transport in Guangxi
Transport in Hunan
Transport in Shanxi
Transport in Hubei
Transport in Henan
Transport in Inner Mongolia